Antonio Francesco Grazzini or Antonfrancisco Grazzini (March 22, 1503February 18, 1584) was an Italian author.

Biography
He was born at Florence or in Staggia Senese (he wrote of himself) of a good family, but there is no record of his upbringing and education. He probably began to practise as an apothecary as a youth; and owned the then famous Farmacia del Moro near the Cathedral. In 1540 he was among the founders of the Accademia degli Umidi, which was soon renamed Accademia Fiorentina. He later took a leading role in the establishment of the more famous Accademia della Crusca, which published his Vocabulario of words accepted as the purest Italian. To both societies he was known as Il Lasca or Leuciscus, a pseudonym which is still frequently substituted for his proper name.

Grazzini was temperamental, his life consequently enlivened or disturbed by various literary quarrels. His Umidi brethren expelled him for a time, because of his ruthless criticism of the Arameans, a party of academicians who maintained that the Florentine language was derived from Hebrew, Aramaic, or some other branch of the Semitic. He was readmitted in 1566, when his friend Salviati was consul.

II Lasca ranks as one of the great masters of Tuscan prose. His style is flexible and abundantly idiomatic, but without affectation. It has the force and freshness of popular speech, whilst retaining a flavour of academic culture.

Main works
Le Cene (1549), a collection of stories in the manner of Boccaccio, and a number of prose comedies. One of the stories is The Story of Doctor Manente, translated and with an introduction by D.H. Lawrence (G. Orioli, 1929).
La Spiritata (1561)
I Parentadi
La Arenga
La Sibilla
La Pinzochera
L'Arzigogolo

A number of miscellaneous poems, a few letters and Four Orations to the Cross complete the list of Grazzini's works.

He also edited the works of Francesco Berni, and collected Tutti I trionfi, larri, mascherate o canti carnascialeschi, andati per Firenze dal tempo del Magnifico Lorenzo vecchio de 'Medici fino all'anno 1559 (the latter influenced Goethe's "Faust"). In 1868 Adamo Rossi published in his Ricerche per le biblioteche di Perugia three novelle by Grazzini, from a manuscript of the 16th century in the Comunale of Perugia; and in 1870 a small collection of those poems which have been left unpublished by previous editors appeared at Poggibonsi, Alcune poesie inedite.

Notes

References
 
 

1503 births
1584 deaths
Writers from Florence
Italian male writers